Aleardo Aleardi (14 November 181217 July 1878), born Gaetano Maria, was an Italian poet who belonged to the so-called Neo-romanticists.

Biography
Aleardo was born in Verona in 1812. He was known for being an active part of the Risorgimento movement. In 1848 he was invited by Daniele Manin to go to Paris to garner support for the Venetian Republic. He was arrested twice: at Mantua in 1852 and at Josephstadt in Bohemia in 1859. After the unification of Italy, he became a member of parliament. In 1873 he became a senator. He later became a professor of aesthetics at Florence, where he died in 1878.

Aleardo Aleardi, whose name was originally Gaetano Maria Aleardi, was born in Verona in 1812 to Maria Channels and Count Giorgio Aleardi. After studying law at the University of Padua together with friends John Meadows and Arnaldo Fusinato, he returned to Verona with an interest in poetry and art criticism. Among his earliest compositions was Marriage (1842), an exaltation of marriage as an expression of civilization, and the Arnalda Roca in 1844. This poem had the historical protagonist of a young woman who dies defending her honor: here we find the search for theatrical effects and dramatic color that is typical of the entire oeuvre of Aleardi. His first success was achieved in 1846 with the two Letters to Mary, in verse, in which the poet addresses a friend proposing a platonic love. It was an opportunity to express his belief in the immortality of the soul and pour out his emotional suffering in a spirit of romanticism.

Notes

External links

 
 

19th-century Italian writers
Italian poets
Italian male poets
Writers from Verona
Italian expatriates in the Czech Republic
1812 births
1878 deaths
19th-century poets
19th-century Italian male writers